Orville Couch (February 21, 1935 – May 26, 2002) was an American country music singer. He recorded one studio album for Vee Jay Records in 1963, in addition to appearing on radio shows. The album produced two singles on the Billboard country music charts: "Hello Trouble" at No. 5 and "Did I Miss You?" at No. 25. Couch died in 2002 of acute limphoblastic leukemia.

Discography

Singles

Album
Hello Trouble (Vee-Jay, 1964)

References

1935 births
2002 deaths
American country singer-songwriters
Singer-songwriters from Texas
Charay Records artists
Vee-Jay Records artists
20th-century American singers
Country musicians from Texas